Onyeka Okongwu (born December 11, 2000) is an American professional basketball player for the Atlanta Hawks of the National Basketball Association (NBA). He played college basketball for the USC Trojans.

Okongwu was a four-year starter at Chino Hills High School in California, playing alongside Lonzo and LaMelo Ball. As a freshman, he helped his team win the state championship and achieve national success, while being named MaxPreps co-National Freshman of the Year. In his junior and senior seasons, Okongwu led Chino Hills to two more state titles, earning back-to-back California Mr. Basketball honors. He was considered a five-star recruit by ESPN and Rivals. In his only college season, Okongwu played for USC and was named to the first team All-Pac-12.

High school career
Okongwu attended Chino Hills High School in Chino Hills, California and started on the varsity basketball team since his freshman season. In his first year, he was teammates with brothers Lonzo, LiAngelo, and LaMelo Ball, who helped elevate the team into the national spotlight. His team ranked number one in the country with a 35–0 record and captured the California Interscholastic Federation (CIF) Open Division state title. Okongwu shared MaxPreps National Freshman of the Year honors with his teammate, LaMelo Ball, after averaging 7.9 points, 7.2 rebounds, and 3.1 blocks per game.

As a sophomore, Okongwu helped Chino Hills reach the CIF Southern Section Open Division semifinals and the CIF State Southern Regional semifinals. In his junior season, he led his team to CIF Southern Section Division I and CIF Division I championships. He averaged 28 points, 14 rebounds, and four blocks per game, earning California Mr. Basketball and USA Today All-USA California first team honors. As a senior, Okongwu led Chino Hills to a runner-up finish at the CIF Southern Section Division I tournament and its second consecutive CIF Division I state title. After averaging 27 points, 11 rebounds, 4.3 blocks, and four assists per game, he repeated as California Mr. Basketball, becoming the fifth player to ever do so, and received USA Today All-USA California first team distinction.

Recruiting
Okongwu finished his freshman season with offers to play college basketball for UCLA and USC. On May 14, 2018, he committed to USC over UCLA and Arizona State. He was drawn to the program because of its proximity and coaching staff. Okongwu left high school as a five-star recruit on ESPN and Rivals and as a four-star recruit on 247Sports.

College career
Okongwu immediately established himself as USC's best player. In his collegiate debut on November 5, 2019, he recorded 20 points, 13 rebounds and a school-record eight blocks to lead the Trojans to a 77–48 victory over Florida A&M. He became the first USC player to post a double-double in his debut since Taj Gibson in 2006. On November 19, he scored a career-high 33 points, including 17 free throws, in a 91–84 win over Pepperdine. The performance helped him claim Pac-12 Conference player and freshman of the week honors on November 25. On December 1, Okongwu recorded 27 points on 12-of-14 shooting, 14 rebounds and three blocks in a 77–62 victory over Harvard at the Orlando Invitational. He scored 28 points, 24 of which came in the second half, and grabbed 12 rebounds in a December 15 win over Long Beach State. One day later, Okongwu was named Pac-12 freshman of the week for his second time.

Okongwu continued his consistency into the Pac-12 season. On January 2, 2020, he had another strong performance, with 27 points on 12-of-14 shooting and 12 rebounds in a 65–56 win over Washington State. On January 24, he tallied 23 points, 14 rebounds and six blocks in a 79–70 double-overtime loss to Oregon. At the conclusion of the regular season, Okongwu was named to the first team All-Pac-12 and the Pac-12 All-Freshman Team. He led USC with 16.2 points, 8.6 rebounds and 2.7 blocks per game. The Pac-12 tournament and the NCAA tournament were canceled due to concerns over the COVID-19 pandemic. On March 25, 2020, Okongwu announced that he would enter the 2020 NBA draft and forgo his final three years of college basketball eligibility. Analysts regarded him as one of the best prospects in the draft.

Professional career

Atlanta Hawks (2020–present)
Okongwu was selected with the sixth overall pick in the 2020 NBA draft by the Atlanta Hawks. On November 24, 2020, the Atlanta Hawks announced that they had signed Okongwu. 

On July 21, 2021, the Atlanta Hawks announced that Okongwu had undergone surgery to repair a torn labrum in his right shoulder and Okongwu would be expected to be sidelined for about six months.

On January 13, 2023, Okongwu put up a career-high 20 rebounds alongside 18 points in a 113–111 win over the Indiana Pacers.

Career statistics

NBA

Regular season

|-
| style="text-align:left;"| 
| style="text-align:left;"| Atlanta
| 50 || 4 || 12.0 || .644 || .000 || .632 || 3.3 || .4 || .5 || .7 || 4.6
|-
| style="text-align:left;"| 
| style="text-align:left;"| Atlanta
| 48 || 6 || 20.7 || .690 || — || .727 || 5.9 || 1.1 || .6 || 1.3 || 8.2
|- class="sortbottom"
| style="text-align:center;" colspan="2"| Career
| 98 || 10 || 16.3 || .672 || .000 || .695 || 4.6 || .7 || .6 || .9 || 6.3

Playoffs

|-
| style="text-align:left;"| 2021
| style="text-align:left;"| Atlanta
| 18 || 0 || 9.2 || .548 || .000 || .667 || 2.7 || .1 || .3 || .7 || 2.7
|-
| style="text-align:left;"| 2022
| style="text-align:left;"| Atlanta
| 5 || 1 || 21.6 || .563 || — || .800 || 5.4 || .4 || .8 || .8 || 5.2
|- class="sortbottom"
| style="text-align:center;" colspan="2"| Career
| 23 || 1 || 11.9 || .553 || .000 || .710 || 3.3 || .2 || .4 || .7 || 3.2

College

|-
| style="text-align:left;"| 2019–20
| style="text-align:left;"| USC
| 28 || 28 || 30.6 || .616 || .250 || .720 || 8.6 || 1.1 || 1.2 || 2.7 || 16.2

Personal life
Onyeka Okongwu was born to Nigerian immigrants in Los Angeles. Okongwu's older brother, Nnamdi, had also played basketball for Chino Hills High School. In 2014, Nnamdi suffered a brain injury in a skateboarding accident and died after spending three days on life support. Okongwu had worn the number 21 jersey in honor of his brother, who had worn the same number while playing basketball. Since being drafted to the NBA by the Hawks, he switched to wearing number 17 as his old number is retired for Dominique Wilkins, representing the age of his brother when he passed. He also has a younger brother, Chukwuemeka, and a younger sister, Chinemya.

Okongwu is the son of Nigerian parents, Kate and Mike Okongwu. His mother, who is a registered nurse, moved to the United States from Nigeria in 1999.

Okongwu's father passed away in 2021.

References

External links

 USC Trojans bio

2000 births
Living people
African-American basketball players
American men's basketball players
American sportspeople of Nigerian descent
Atlanta Hawks draft picks
Atlanta Hawks players
Basketball players from Los Angeles
Centers (basketball)
Chino Hills High School alumni
People from Chino Hills, California
Power forwards (basketball)
Sportspeople from San Bernardino County, California
USC Trojans men's basketball players
21st-century African-American sportspeople
20th-century African-American sportspeople